Goshen is an Unincorporated community in Parker County, Texas, United States which developed around a Methodist church.

See also
Goshen

References

Gustavus Adolphus Holland, History of Parker County and the Double Log Cabin (Weatherford, Texas: Herald, 1931; rpt. 1937), cited in The Handbook of Texas Online
Henry Smythe, Historical Sketch of Parker County and Weatherford (St. Louis: Lavat, 1877; rpt., Waco: Morrison, 1973), cited in The Handbook of Texas Online

Unincorporated communities in Parker County, Texas
Unincorporated communities in Texas
Former populated places in Texas